Where You Live is Tracy Chapman's seventh studio album and was released September 13, 2005. The album was co-produced by Tchad Blake. It produced two singles: Change, and America. 

Its name comes from the line 'home is where you live/home is where you die', from the fourth song in this album, Going Back.

Track listing
All songs are written by Tracy Chapman.

"Change" – 5:06
"Talk to You" – 4:27
"3,000 Miles" – 5:58
"Going Back" – 5:22
"Don't Dwell" – 3:22
"Never Yours" – 3:37
"America" – 3:43
"Love's Proof" – 3:44
"Before Easter" – 3:03
"Taken" – 3:42
"Be and Be Not Afraid" – 4:44
"Lose Your Love" – 6:27 (Bonus track on the Japanese version)

Personnel
Tracy Chapman – acoustic & electric guitar, clarinet, harmonica, mandolin, percussion, glockenspiel, keyboard bass, hand drums
Paul Bushnell – bass
Flea – bass
Mitchell Froom – organ, celeste, harpsichord, Fender Rhodes, Wurlitzer
Joe Gore – acoustic & electric guitar, dobro, percussion, bass, lap steel guitar, keyboard bass
David Piltch – upright bass
Michael Webster – keyboards
Quinn Smith – percussion, piano, drums, glockenspiel

Charts

Weekly charts

Year-end charts

Certifications

References

External links
Fan site info on the album

Tracy Chapman albums
2005 albums
Albums produced by Tchad Blake
Elektra Records albums